Super Bikes! is a television show that first aired on Speed Channel in 2006. It follows popular American stunt rider Jason Britton as he goes around the country to check out the sport bike scene. The show mostly showcases stunt riding and stunting competitions, but it also delves into other aspects of the sport bike culture and motor sports in general.

Episode list

Season 2

Season 3

Season 4

2006 American television series debuts
2010s American television series
American sports television series
Automotive television series
Speed (TV network) original programming
Motorcycle television series